The 1928 World Table Tennis Championships women's doubles was the inaugural edition of the women's doubles championship. 

Fanchette Flamm and Mária Mednyánszky defeated Doris Gubbins and Brenda Sommerville in the final by three sets to nil.

Results

See also
List of World Table Tennis Championships medalists

References

-
World